Pārogre Station is a railway station on the Riga – Daugavpils Railway between Ogre Station and Ciemupe Station. Pārogre Station is the only railway station in Latvia, from which the next station (Ogre Station) is visible.

References

Railway stations in Latvia
Railway stations opened in 1931